The 1931 Southern Intercollegiate Athletic Association men's basketball tournament took place February 25–28, 1931, at Jackson, MS. The Centenary Gentlemen won their first Southern Intercollegiate Athletic Association title, led by head coach Curtis Parker. 

"Winning the S. I. A. A. tournament at Jackson, Miss., gave the Gentlemen the championship of their own conference. Centenary played great basketball to win the tournament, and were without a doubt the cleverest passing team at Jackson. For this the school received a beautiful full size silver basketball suitably engraved, and each player was awarded a solid gold medal."

Bracket

Championship

See also
List of SIAA basketball champions

References

Tournament
Southern Athletic Association Intercollegiate men's basketball tournament
Southern Athletic Association Intercollegiate men's basketball tournament